The Rennes Metro is a light metro system serving the city of Rennes in Brittany, France. Opened on March 15, 2002, it made Rennes the smallest city to have a metro system from 2002 to 2008.

Currently the system contains two lines, Line A and B. It has 28 stations and stretches , with the majority of its route underground. The line A connects the quarter of Villejean to the quarter of Poterie, passing the city center. It is based on the Siemens VAL (véhicule automatique léger or light automatic vehicle in English) technology. In 2014, approximately 140,000 trips were made on the line daily.

A second line, Line B, is opened on September 20, 2022. Running north-east to south-west between Cesson-Sévigné and Saint-Jacques-de-la-Lande, it also has 15 stations, two of them interchangeable with Line A, forming an x-shaped network. It will be the first metro line in the world to use the NeoVal technology. Originally planned to open in 2020, the line suffered multiple delays, mainly due to the COVID-19 pandemic. After the opening of Line B, Rennes became the smallest city with two metro lines.

History 
During the 1960s, Henri Fréville (the Mayor of Rennes) discussed the return of the city's tramway which had been dissolved by the Mayor's predecessor, Yves Milon. However, the former tramway was disliked due to it being out of tune with the car-centric mentality of the city. When Charles de Gaulle visited Rennes on 31 March 1969, he remarked to Henri Fréville, "When you have a million inhabitants, you can have your metro."

The planning document underpinning urban transport structure (plan de déplacements urbains) in Rennes underwent a redesign which began in September 1984. This redesign was brought about by Mayor Edmond Hervé, who sought to ease congestion and reduce its future risk by remapping the city centre. 

Between June and September 1986, SITCAR conducted the first studies considering the creation of a public transport system, separated from road traffic, for Rennes in response to the continued increases in passenger frequency. Several studies were to be conducted considering two different modes of transport: tramway and light railway.
 1986: City Council decides to create a transport line on a north-western/south-eastern axis.
 1989: The municipality decides to use VAL technology.
 1992: The A Line project receives planning and environmental approvals.
 1997: Beginning of work on Line A.
 2002: Opening of Line A.
 2005: Three park-and-ride lots were set up
 2006: Creation of Korrigo card
 2007: City Council decides to create a second metro line (B)
 2010: The municipality decides to use CityVal technology.
 2011: The B Line project receives planning and environmental approvals.
 2014: Beginning of work on Line B
 2022: Opening of Line B

Line A 

Opened on 15 March 2002, Line A is based on the Siemens VAL (véhicule automatique léger or light automatic vehicle) technology. The  Line A runs roughly northwest to southeast from J.F. Kennedy to La Poterie via Gare de Rennes (served by Gares metro station), with fifteen stations (thirteen of which are underground). 
 
Services run between 05:20 and 00:40 each day (except Thursday, Friday and Saturday between 05:20 and 01:35), and with a waiting time of approximately 80 seconds between trains. All stations are equipped with platform screen doors and lifts. 

In January 2005, three park-and-ride lots were set up, offering 900 places to motorists. Two more opened in 2006–2007, able to accommodate an additional 700 vehicles.

On 1 March 2006, a card called KorriGo was created as a supplement to the ticket system to improve the metro traffic and the city's bus network.

The line is maintained by Service des Transports en Commun de l'Agglomération Rennaise (STAR), and managed by Keolis. It has a staff of approximately 100. It is operated from a control centre (poste de commande centralisée) situated in Chantepie. 120 cameras monitor the stations.

The station at La Poterie and viaducts on the line were designed by Foster + Partners.

With a population of just 205,000 inhabitants for city proper (in 2002), Rennes was the smallest city in the world to boast a metro until 2008 (when Lausanne Metro opened). However in 2013, 425,000 people (211 000 in Rennes) are served by the network in 43 municipalities. On average, there are 135,000 metro trips each day; this figure is expected to rise to 180,000 in coming years, leading to possible gridlock during the rush hours.

Stations 
The station names have been chosen for the nearest existing streets or for points of interest near the station locations.

 J.F. Kennedy (former US President)
 Villejean-Université: University of Rennes 1 and University of Rennes 2
 Pontchaillou (elevated): Teaching hospital
 Anatole France (French poet and journalist)
 Sainte-Anne (French queen and Duchess of Brittany): city-center
 République: city-center
 Charles de Gaulle (former French President): city-center
 Gares (SNCF interchange): city-center
 Jacques Cartier (French navigator and explorer)
 Clemenceau (World War I French Prime Minister)
 Henri Fréville (former mayor of Rennes)
 Italie
 Triangle
 Blosne
 La Poterie (elevated)

Station signage is in French and Gallo at Charles de Gaulle station and French and Breton at Gares station.

Gallery

Line B 

Opened on 20 September, 2022, Line B is based on the new NeoVal technology. The line is interchangeable with Line A at two stations, Sainte-Anne and Gare, and other two stations, Saint-Germain and Colombier, are within walking distance to Line A. 

The two terminal stations, Saint-Jacques - Gaîté and Cesson - Viasilva, as well as Les Gayeulles are served by the Parc relais (ride-and-park service) operated by STAR.

The viaduct serves three stations: Cesson - Viasilva, Atlante, and Beaulieu - Université. At the end of the viaduct on the "Beaulieu - Université" station side, the line goes underground via an opening on the ground next to the parking lots of the university residence.

With the new line about to be open, the operator of Rennes' public transport system, Service des Transports en Commun de l'Agglomération Rennaise (STAR) have announced changes for the bus network, scheduled to take effect on 24 October, a month after the opening of Line B. In addition, the bus line C3, currently having the same shade of green as the future Line B, will change its colour to yellow.

To promote the newly opening line, STAR announced that the entire Line B will be free on the first week of its operation, until Sunday, 25 September. In addition, there will also be various celebration activities held at 5 stations: Saint-Jacques - Gaîté, La Courrouze, Cleunay, Gros-Chêne, and Cesson - Viasilva, as well as exhibitions of the new metro at Sainte-Anne station.

On the day of opening, both lines of the metro network saw record-breaking daily ridership, with 155,000 riderships on Line A and 120,000 riderships on Line B, and an estimated 10% of the riderships transferring between the two lines. The two transfer stations, "Sainte-Anne" and "Gares", also saw the highest daily ridership of 23,000 and 15,000. The operator STAR have expected a daily ridership of 110,000 in the long term.

Stations 
 Saint-Jacques - Gaîté
 La Courrouze
 Cleunay
 Mabilais (4th tallest building in Rennes, Le Mabilay)
 Colombier: city-center
 Gares : city-center
 Saint-Germain (Saint-Germain Church): city-center
 Sainte-Anne: city-center
 Jules Ferry (French statesman and republican philosopher)
 Gros-Chêne
 Les Gayeulles (Park of Gayeulles)
 Joliot-Curie - Chateaubriand (lycée Joliot-Curie and lycée Chateaubriand)
 Beaulieu - Université (University of Rennes 1, Institut national des sciences appliquées de Rennes, and École nationale supérieure de chimie de Rennes)
 Atalante (technopole of Rennes Atlante)
 Cesson - Viasilva

See also 
 List of metro systems

References

External links 

 STAR – official website 
 STAR – new metro, new network 
 Official website for the Line B project (in French)
 Map of Rennes Métro  (in French)
 Rennes at UrbanRail.net 

Rapid transit in France
Rennes
Transport in Brittany
VAL people movers
2002 establishments in France